Fuel is a monthly peer-reviewed scientific journal covering research on fuel. It was established in 1922 as Fuel in Science and Practice, obtaining its current name in 1948. It is published by Elsevier (formerly Butterworths Scientific Publications) and the editors-in-chief are Zuohua Huang (Xi'an Jiaotong University), Jillian Goldfarb (Cornell University), and Bill Nimmo (University of Sheffield). According to the Journal Citation Reports, the journal has a 2019 impact factor of 5.578.

References

External links

Publications established in 1922
Monthly journals
Elsevier academic journals
English-language journals
Energy and fuel journals